Nikos Petzaropulos (17 January 1927 – 29 March 1979) was a Greek footballer, who played as a goalkeeper, mainly for Panionios. He earned the nickname "Hero of Tampere", after his performance with Greek Olympic team in 1952.

Club career

Early years and distinction
Petzaropulos began playing football at the local Keravnos at 1940. In 1943 he joined Panionios, at the age of 16. He was discovered by the goalkeeping coach of the "red and blues", Giorgos Roussopoulos who realized in an instant that Petzaropoulos was a rare talent. He established himself quickly to first team and from a young age, in 1948 and became an international for the first time.

He gave a worth seeing performance with his exceptional reflexes, his ability to save the ball and his successive interceptions on penalty kicks making the supporters delirious. A characteristic was from an incident from a match at Karaiskakis Stadium against Olympiacos. Petzaropoulos shot from the box, but due to the strong opposing wind, the ball reached at the middle of the field. Andreas Mouratis of Olympiacos, who was renowned for his strong shots, unleashed a power shot sending the ball towards the goal post of Panionios. On the 6-yard-line, watching that the ball was passing over him, Petzaropoulos jumped on the air, turned his body 180 degrees, stretched and punched the ball to safety, falling into the nets. The crowd was cheering for him for his stunning save and Mouratis ran to him, helped him get up and kissed him.

Internazionale
The magnificent performance, with the national team against Denmark on the 1952 Olympics, was not to be unnoticed. The coach of Internazionale, Alfredo Foni, who was on the stadium was impressed and he suggested him to sign a professional contract at the Italian club. In an age where Greek football's level was completely amateur and footballers had any income at all, the professionalism and the exceptionally high wage that was suggested by Inter made him impressed. After all, Petzaropoulos was not from a wealthy family and he barely made his living.

The dream of a professional career in a European top club made him depart for Milan in August 1952. He signed a professional contract with Inter and started training with the Italian club, hoping that the administration of Panionios would give him his freedom. However, the unexpected departure of his was negatively handled and they didn't give in to the financial exchanges that the Italians were offering. The desirable transfer never took place, even if he stayed almost one year in Italy.

In friendly matches with Inter, Petzaropoulos was also impressive. Indicative of the Italians' adulation for his figure, was an article of an Italian newspaper with a big picture, which was portrays Petzaropoulos on a stunning save, blocking the ball and literally being across the ground and little bit lower than the bar. The title of the article was "The flying goalkeeper" and the caption wrote "Petzaropoulos can fly...".

Return to Panionios
Petzaropoulos returned to Greece, disappointed and embittered in 1953. As the press of that time described an impressive welcome was given to him on Larissa station and after a while he came back to action with Panionios. He didn't remind of the good old Petzaropoulos, the "flying goalkeeper" who was beloved by all Greeks and disappointed he retired from football at the young age of 28.

International career
Petzaropulos had a total of 11 games with Greece, and also played in 3 matches against Turkey as Greece All Star. He made his debut as an international on 28 November 1948 in a friendly match against Turkey, entering as a substitute in the second half with his team losing 1–2, and the score staying that way until the end of the match. During the period 1949–1952 Petzaropoulos played 8 matches, all of which were for the Friendship Cup of Eastern Mediterranean against Egypt (1-3), Italy B (2-3,0-3), France B (0-1), Syria (8-0) and Turkey (1-2,3-1,1-0).

Afterwards he was part of the Olympic team in 1952 Summer Olympics at Helsinki on Finland, where he made his greatest performance in Tampere. His last match with Greece was on 25 July 1952, after their elimination from the Olympic Tournament, against Great Britain in a 4–2 win.

Hero of Tampere
The 15 July 1952 was a landmark of his career. His tenth international game against the mighty Denmark at the city of Tampere for the Olympic Tournament of 1952 in Helsinki. At the presence of 7,000 people Petzaropoulos made the greatest game of his career. Springing like a tiger, making a lot of saving interventions against the hammering shots of Dane footballers. Finally, the match ended in a 1–2 defeat for Greece, but Petzaropoulos was cheered by the crowd.

Petzaropoulos was called the "Hero of Tampere" from the Greek journalists who were constantly posting glowing articles dedicated to him. The international press was accordingly encomiastic. "The New Zamora was born" was the title of many European newspapers after the game, comparing him, with the greatest goalkeeper at the time.

Managerial career
The later years, Petzaropoulos was involved with coaching and after that he coached the Youth Team of Panionios. His dream was to establish a goalkeeping school. In a short time before his death Petzaropoulos taught all his secrets to the young Antonis Manikas, which in a few years later praised his teacher after he saved 15 penalties in only 3 years and became an international footballer.

Death
The curtain closed for Petzaropoulos at 27 March 1979. He died at 52 smitten by an incurable disease, failing to see his favourite team, Panionios, conquering the Greek Cup, after a few months. The sad news were top news all over the country and the sport press was showing long time features.

References

External links
Alekos Papadopoulos, «NIKOS PETZAROPOULOS: The hero of Tampere»
pgss.gr
Nikos Petzaropoulos: The «hero of Tampere» panionianea.gr (in Greek)

1927 births
1979 deaths
Greece international footballers
Panionios F.C. players
Olympic footballers of Greece
Footballers at the 1952 Summer Olympics
Association football goalkeepers
Footballers from Athens
Greek footballers